Wang Tao (born November 1931) is a Chinese executive and politician who served as  from 1985 to 1988, general manager of the China Petrochemical Corporation from 1988 to 1989, and general manager of the China National Petroleum Corporation from 1989 to 1996.

He was a member of the 12th, 13th and 14th Central Committee of the Chinese Communist Party. He was a member of the Standing Committee of the 9th National People's Congress.

Biography
Wang was born in Huaide County (now Gongzhuling), Jilin in November 1931, while his ancestral home in Laoting County, Hebei. He joined the Chinese Communist Party (CCP) in December 1948. In 1952, he was admitted to Northeast Institute of Technology (now Northeastern University) and then studied at Changchun Institute of Geology (now Jilin University). After studying Russian in Beijing Russian Special School for a year in 1954, he was sent to study at Sverdlovsk Mining Institute, where he received his vice-doctorate degree in 1963.

In June 1986, he was promoted to become , a position he held until April 1988. He was general manager of the China Petrochemical Corporation in 1988, but having held the position for only a year. In 1989, he became general manager of the China National Petroleum Corporation, a post he kept until December 1996.

In March 1998, he took office as vice chairperson of the National People's Congress Environment Protection and Resources Conservation Committee.

References

1931 births
Living people
People from Gongzhuling
Northeastern University (China) alumni
Jilin University alumni
People's Republic of China politicians from Jilin
Chinese Communist Party politicians from Jilin
Members of the 12th Central Committee of the Chinese Communist Party
Members of the 13th Central Committee of the Chinese Communist Party
Members of the 14th Central Committee of the Chinese Communist Party
Members of the Standing Committee of the 9th National People's Congress